The Organization of Ukrainian Nationalists (OUN) was a Ukrainian ultranationalist and terrorist organization established in 1929 in Vienna, as a union between the Ukrainian Military Organization and smaller, mainly youth, radical nationalist right-wing groups. The OUN was the largest and one of the most important far-right Ukrainian organizations operating on the territory of the Second Polish Republic in the interwar period. 

Mostly active in the period preceding, during and the immediate aftermath of the Second World War, the ideology of the OUN has been described as influenced by the works of Dmytro Dontsov, from 1929 by Italian Fascism and from 1930 by German Nazism. In this period, the organization pursued a strategy of violence, terrorism and assassinations with the goal of creating an ethnically homogenous and totalitarian Ukrainian state.

During the Second World War, in 1940, the OUN split into two parts. The older, more moderate members supported Andriy Melnyk and the OUN-M, while the younger and more radical members supported Stepan Bandera's OUN-B. The OUN-B declared an independent Ukrainian state on 30 June 1941 in Lviv, which had just come under the control of Nazi Germany in the early stages of the Axis invasion of the Soviet Union. It pledged to work closely with Germany, which was presented as freeing Ukrainians from Soviet oppression, and OUN members subsequently took part in the Lviv pogroms. In response to the declaration of independence, the Nazi authorities suppressed the OUN leadership. Members of the OUN took an active part in the Holocaust in Ukraine and Poland. In October 1942, the OUN-B established the Ukrainian Insurgent Army (UPA). In 1943–1944, in an effort to prevent Polish efforts to re-establish pre-war borders, UPA units carried out the massacres of Poles in Volhynia and Eastern Galicia. Historians estimate that 50-130,000 Polish civilians were massacred in Volhynia and Eastern Galicia.

In the course of the war, with the approaching defeat of Nazi Germany, the OUN-B changed its political image. It moved away from fascist symbolism and totalitarianism toward democratic slogans. 

After World War II, the UPA fought against Soviet and Polish government forces. During Operation Vistula in 1947, the Polish government deported 140,000 Ukrainians as part of the population exchange between Poland and Soviet Ukraine. In total, Soviet forces killed 153,000, arrested 134,000, and deported 203,000 UPA members, relatives, and supporters. During and after the Cold War, Western intelligence agencies, including the CIA, covertly supported the OUN. A contemporary organization that claims to be the same Organization of Ukrainian Nationalists is still active in Ukraine.

History

Background and creation

In 1919, with the end of the Polish–Ukrainian War, the Second Polish Republic took over most of the territory claimed by the West Ukrainian People's Republic and the rest was absorbed by the Soviet Union. One year later, exiled Ukrainian officers, mostly former Sich Riflemen, founded the Ukrainian Military Organization (Ukrainian – Українська Військова Організація: Ukrayins'ka Viys'kova Orhanizatsiya, the UVO), an underground military organization with the goals of continuing the armed struggle for independent Ukraine. The UVO was strictly a military organization with a military command structure. Originally the UVO operated under the authority of the exiled government of the Western Ukrainian People's Republic, but in 1925 following a power struggle all the supporters of the exiled president Yevhen Petrushevych were expelled from the organisation.

The leader of the UVO was Yevhen Konovalets, the former commander of the elite Sich Riflemen. West Ukrainian political parties secretly funded the organization. The UVO organized a wave of sabotage actions in the second half of 1922, when Polish settlers were attacked, police stations, railroad stations, telegraph poles and railroad tracks were destroyed. Attempted to assassinate the Poland's Chief of State Józef Piłsudski in 1921. In 1922, they organized 17 attacks on Polish officials, 5 of whom were killed, and 15 attacks on Ukrainians, whom they considered traitors, 9 of whom died, among them Sydir Tverdokhlib. UVO continued this type of activity, on a smaller scale later as well.

When the League of Nations recognized Polish rule over western Ukraine in 1923, many members left the UVO. The Ukrainian legal parties turned against the UVO's militant actions, preferring to work within the Polish political system. As a result, the UVO turned to Germany and Lithuania for political and financial support.

It established contact with militant anti-Polish student organizations, such as the Group of Ukrainian National Youth, the League of Ukrainian Nationalists, and the Union of Ukrainian Nationalist Youth. After preliminary meetings in Berlin in 1927 and Prague in 1928, at the founding congress in Vienna in 1929 the veterans of the UVO and the student militants met and united to form the Organization of Ukrainian Nationalists (OUN). Although the members consisted mostly of Galician youths, Yevhen Konovalets served as its first leader and its leadership council, the Provid, comprised mostly veterans and was based abroad.

Pre-war activities

Prior to World War II, the OUN was smaller and less influential among the Ukrainians minority in Poland than the moderate UNDO party. The OUN sought to infiltrate legal political parties, universities and other political structures and institutions. 

OUN nationalists were trained by Mussolini in Sicily jointly with the Ustase, they also maintained offices in Berlin and Vienna. Before the war, the OUN regarded the Second Polish Republic as an immediate target, but viewed the Soviet Union, although not operating on its territory, as the main enemy and greatest oppressor of the Ukrainian people. Even before the war, impressed by the successes of fascism, OUN radicalised its stance, and it saw Nazi Germany as its main ally in the fight for independence.

In contrast to UNDO, the OUN accepted violence as a political tool against foreign and domestic enemies of their cause. Most of its activity was directed against Polish politicians and government representatives. Under the command of the Western Ukrainian Territorial Executive (established in February 1929), the OUN carried out hundreds of acts of sabotage in Galicia and Volhynia, including a campaign of arson against Polish landowners (which helped provoke the 1930 Pacification), boycotts of state schools and Polish tobacco and liquor monopolies, dozens of expropriation attacks on government institutions to obtain funds for its activities, and assassinations. From 1921 to 1939 UVO and OUN carried out 63 known assassinations: 36 Ukrainians (among them one communist), 25 Poles, 1 Russian and 1 Jew. This number is likely an underestimate because there were likely unrecorded killings in rural regions.

The OUN's victims during this period included Tadeusz Hołówko, a Polish promoter of Ukrainian-Polish compromise, Emilian Czechowski, Lwow's Polish police commissioner, Alexei Mailov, a Soviet consular official killed in retaliation for the Holodomor, and most notably Bronisław Pieracki, the Polish interior minister. The OUN also killed moderate Ukrainian figures such as the respected teacher (and former officer of the Ukrainian Galician Army) Ivan Babij. Most of these killings were organized locally and occurred without the authorization or knowledge of the OUN's emigre leaders abroad. In 1930 OUN members assaulted the head of the Shevchenko Scientific Society Kyryl Studynsky in his office. Such acts were condemned by the head of the Ukrainian Greek Catholic Church, Metropolitan Andriy Sheptytsky, who was particularly critical of the OUN's leadership in exile who inspired acts of youthful violence, writing that they were "using our children to kill their parents" and that "whoever demoralizes our youth is a criminal and an enemy of the people." OUN's terrorist methods, fascination with fascism, rejection of parliamentary democracy and acting against Poland on behalf of Germany did not find support among many other Ukrainian organizations, especially among the so-called Petlurites, i.e. former activists of the Ukrainian People's Republic.

As Polish persecution of Ukrainians during the interwar period increased, many Ukrainians (particularly the youth, many of whom felt they had no future) lost faith in traditional legal approaches, in their elders, and in the western democracies who were seen as turning their backs on Ukraine. The young were much more radical, calling for the use of terror in political struggle, but both groups were united by national radicalism and advocacy of a totalitarian system. The leader of the "old" group Andriy Melnyk claimed in a letter sent to the German minister of foreign affairs Joachim von Ribbentrop on 2 May 1938 that the OUN was ideologically akin to similar movements in Europe, especially to National Socialism in Germany and Fascism in Italy. This period of disillusionment coincided with the increase in support for the OUN. By the beginning of the Second World War, the OUN was estimated to have 20,000 active members and many times that number of sympathizers. Many bright students, such as the talented young poets  and Olena Teliha (executed by the Nazis at Babi Yar) were attracted to the OUN's revolutionary message.

As a means to gain independence from Polish and Soviet oppression, before World War II the OUN accepted material and moral support from Nazi Germany. The Germans, needing Ukrainian assistance against the Soviet Union, were expected by the OUN to further the goal of Ukrainian independence. Although some elements of the German military were inclined to do so, they were ultimately overruled by Adolf Hitler and his political organization, whose racial prejudice against the Ukrainians and desires for economic exploitation of Ukraine precluded cooperation. The interwar Lithuanian government had particularly close ties with the OUN.

During World War II

Split in the OUN 
In September 1939 Poland was  invaded and split by Germany and the Soviet Union. On 1 November 1939, Polish territories annexed by the Soviet Union (i.e. Volhynia and Eastern Galicia) were incorporated into the Ukrainian Soviet Socialist Republic.

Initially, the Soviet occupation of eastern Poland was met with limited support from the ethnic Ukrainian population. Repression was directed mainly against the ethnic Poles, and the Ukrainisation of education, land reform, and other changes were popular among the Ukrainians. The situation changed in the middle of 1940 when collectivisation began and repressions hit the Ukrainian population. There were 2,779 Ukrainians arrested in 1939, 15,024 in 1940 and 5,500 in 1941, until the German invasion of the Soviet Union.

The situation for ethnic Ukrainians under German occupation was much better. About 550,000 Ukrainians lived in the General Government in the German-occupied portion of Poland, and they were favoured at the expense of Poles. Approximately 20 thousand Ukrainian activists escaped from the Soviet occupation to Warsaw or Kraków. In late 1939, Nazi Germany accommodated OUN leaders in the city of Kraków, the capital of the General Government and provided a financial support for the OUN. The headquarters of the Ukrainian Central Committee headed by Volodymyr Kubiyovych, the legal representation of the Ukrainian community in the Nazi zone, were also located in Kraków.

Despite the differences, the OUN's leader Yevhen Konovalets was able to maintain unity within the organization. Konovalets was assassinated by a Soviet agent, Pavel Sudoplatov, in Rotterdam in May 1938. He was succeeded by Andriy Melnyk, a 48-year-old former colonel in the army of the Ukrainian People's Republic and one of the founders of the UVO. He was chosen to lead the OUN despite not having been involved in activities throughout the 1930s. Melnyk was more friendly to the Church than were any of his associates (the OUN was generally anti-clerical), and had even become the chairman of a Ukrainian Catholic youth organization that was regarded as anti-Nationalist by many OUN members. His choice was seen as an attempt by the leadership to repair ties with the Church and to become more pragmatic and moderate. However, this direction was opposite to the trend within western Ukraine itself.

In Kraków on 10 February 1940 a revolutionary faction of the OUN emerged, called the OUN-R or, after its leader Stepan Bandera, the OUN-B (Banderites). This was opposed by the current leadership of the organization, so it split, and the old group was called OUN-M after the leader Andriy Melnyk (Melnykites). The OUN-M dominated Ukrainian emigration and the Bukovina, but in Ukraine itself, the Banderists gained a decisive advantage (60% of the agent network in Volhynia and 80% in Eastern Galicia). Political leader Transcarpathian Ukrainians Avgustyn Voloshyn praised Melnyk as a Christian of European culture, in contrast to many nationalists who placed the nation above God. OUN-M leadership was more experienced and had some limited contacts in Eastern Ukraine; it also maintained contact with German intelligence and the Germany army. OUN-B consisted mainly of Galician youth, who were earlier shut out of the leadership. It had a strong network of devoted followers and was powerfully aided by Mykola Lebed, who began to organize the feared Sluzhba Bezpeky or SB, a secret police force modelled on the Cheka with a reputation for ruthlessness.

Early years of the war and activities in Central and Eastern Ukraine

On 25 February 1941, the head of Abwehr Wilhelm Franz Canaris sanctioned the creation of the "Ukrainian Legion". Ukrainian Nachtigall and Roland battalions were formed under German command and numbered about 800 men. OUN-B expected that it would become the core of the future Ukrainian army.

The OUN-B already in 1940 began preparations for an anti-Soviet uprising. However, Soviet repression delayed these plans and more serious fighting did not occur until after the German invasion of the USSR in July 1941. According to OUN-B reports, they then had about 20,000 men grouped in 3,300 locations in Western Ukraine. The NKVD was determined to liquidate the Ukrainian underground, according to Soviet reports 4435 members were arrested between October 1939 and December 1940. There were public trials and death sentences were carried out. In the first half of 1941, 3073 families (11329 people) of members of the Polish and Ukrainian underground were deported from Eastern Galicia and Volhynia. Soviet repression forced about a thousand members of the Ukrainian underground to take up partisan activities even before the German invasion.

After Germany's invasion of the USSR, on 30 June 1941, OUN seized about 213 villages and organized diversion in the rear of the Red Army. In the process, it lost 2,100 soldiers and 900 were wounded. The OUN-B formed Ukrainian militias that, displaying exceptional cruelty, carried out antisemitic pogroms and massacres of Jews. The biggest pogroms carried out by the Ukrainian nationalists took place in Lviv resulting in the massacre of 6,000 Polish Jews. The involvement of OUN-B is unclear, but certainly OUN-B propaganda fuelled antisemitism. The vast majority of pogroms carried out by the Banderites occurred in Eastern Galicia and Volhynia.

Eight days after Germany's invasion of the USSR, on 30 June 1941, the OUN-B proclaimed the establishment of Ukrainian State in Lviv, with Yaroslav Stetsko as premier.

In response to the declaration, OUN-B leaders and associates were arrested and imprisoned by the Gestapo (ca.1500 persons). Many OUN-B members were killed outright or perished in jails and concentration camps (both of Bandera's brothers were eventually murdered at Auschwitz). On 18 September 1941 Bandera and Stetsko were sent to Sachsenhausen concentration camp in "Zellenbau Bunker". Bandera was imprisoned along with some of the most important prisoners of the Third Reich, such as the ex-prime minister of France Léon Blum and ex-chancellor of Austria, Kurt Schuschnigg. The prisoners of Zellenbau received help from the Red Cross unlike common concentration camp prisoners and were able to send and receive parcels from their relatives. Bandera also received help from the OUN-B including financial assistance. The Germans permitted the Ukrainian nationalists to leave the bunker for an important meeting with OUN representatives in Fridental Castle which was 200 meters from Sachsenhausen., where they were kept until September 1944.

As a result of the German crackdown on the OUN-B, the faction controlled by Melnyk enjoyed an advantage over its rival and was able to occupy many positions in the civil administration of former Soviet Ukraine during the first months of German occupation. The first city which it administered was Zhitomir, the first major city across the old Soviet-Polish border. Here, the OUN-M helped stimulate the development of Prosvita societies, the appearance of local artists on Ukrainian-language broadcasts, the opening of two new secondary schools and a pedagogical institute, and the establishment of a school administration. Many locals were recruited into the OUN-M. The OUN-M also organized police forces, recruited from Soviet prisoners of war. Two senior members of its leadership, or Provid, even came to Zhitomir. At the end of August 1941, however, they were both gunned down, allegedly by the OUN-B which had justified the assassination in their literature and had issued a secret directive (referred to by Andriy Melnyk as a "death sentence") not to allow OUN-M leaders to reach Ukrainian SSR's capital Kiev (now Kyiv, Ukraine). In retaliation, the German authorities, often tipped off by OUN-M members, began mass arrests and executions of OUN-B members, to a large extent eliminating it in much of central and eastern Ukraine.

As the Wehrmacht moved East, the OUN-M established control of Kiev's civil administration; that city's mayor from October 1941 until January 1942, Volodymyr Bahaziy, belonged to the OUN-M and used his position to funnel money into it and to help the OUN-M take control over Kiev's police. The OUN-M also initiated the creation of the Ukrainian National Council in Kiev, which was to become the basis for a future Ukrainian government. At this time, the OUN-M also came to control Kiev's largest newspaper and was able to attract many supporters from the central and eastern Ukrainian intelligentsia. Alarmed by the OUN-M's growing strength in central and eastern Ukraine, the German Nazi authorities swiftly and brutally cracked down on it, arresting and executing many of its members in early 1942, including Volodymyr Bahaziy, and the writer Olena Teliha who had organized and led the League of Ukrainian Writers in Kiev. Although during this time elements within the Wehrmacht tried in vain to protect OUN-M members, the organization was largely wiped out within central and eastern Ukraine.

OUN-B's fight for dominance in western Ukraine 
As the OUN-M was being wiped out in the regions of central and western Ukraine that had been east of the old Polish-Soviet border, in Volhynia the OUN-B, with easy access from its base in Galicia, began to establish and consolidate its control over the nationalist movement and much of the countryside. Unwilling and unable to openly resist the Germans in early 1942, it methodically set about creating a clandestine organization, engaging in propaganda work, and building weapons stockpiles. A major aspect of its programme was the infiltration of the local police; the OUN-B was able to establish control over the police academy in Rivne. By doing so the OUN-B hoped to eventually overwhelm the German occupation authorities ("If there were fifty policemen to five Germans, who would hold power then?"). In their role within the police, Bandera's forces were involved in the extermination of Jewish civilians and the clearing of Jewish ghettos, actions that contributed to the OUN-B's weapon stockpiles. In addition, blackmailing Jews served as a source of added finances. During the time that the OUN-B in Volhynia was avoiding conflict with the German authorities and working with them, resistance to the Germans was limited to Soviet partisans on the extreme northern edge of the region, to small bands of OUN-M fighters, and to a group of guerillas knowns as the UPA or the Polessian Sich, unaffiliated with the OUN-B and led by Taras Bulba-Borovets of the exiled Ukrainian People's Republic.

By late 1942, the status quo for the OUN-B was proving to be increasingly difficult. The German authorities were becoming increasingly repressive towards the Ukrainian population, and the Ukrainian police were reluctant to take part in such actions. Furthermore, Soviet partisan activity threatened to become the major outlet for anti-German resistance among western Ukrainians. By March 1943, the OUN-B leadership issued secret instructions ordering their members who had joined the German police in 1941–1942, numbering between 4,000 and 5,000 trained and armed soldiers, to desert with their weapons and to join the units of the OUN-B in Volyn. Borovets attempted to unite his UPA, the smaller OUN-M and other nationalist bands, and the OUN-B underground into an all-party front. The OUN-M agreed while the OUN-B refused, in part due to the insistence of the OUN-B that their leaders be in control of the organization.

After negotiations failed, the OUN commander Dmytro Klyachkivsky coopted the name of Borovets' organization, UPA, and decided to accomplish by force what could not be accomplished through negotiation: the unification of Ukrainian nationalist forces under OUN-B control. On 6 July, the large OUN-M group was surrounded and surrendered, and soon afterward most of the independent groups disappeared; they were either destroyed by the Communist partisans or the OUN-B or joined the latter. On 18 August 1943, Taras Bulba-Borovets and his headquarters were surrounded in a surprise attack by an OUN-B force consisting of several battalions. Some of his forces, including his wife, were captured, while five of his officers were killed. Borovets escaped but refused to submit, in a letter accusing the OUN-B of among other things: banditry; of wanting to establish a one-party state; and of fighting not for the people but in order to rule the people. In retaliation, his wife was murdered after two weeks of torture at the hands of the OUN-B's SB. In October 1943 Bulba-Borovets largely disbanded his depleted force in order to end further bloodshed. In their struggle for dominance in Volhynia, the Banderists would kill tens of thousands of Ukrainians for links to Bulba-Borovets or Melnyk.

OUN-B's fight against Germany, Soviet Union and Poland 
 
By the fall of 1943 the OUN-B forces had established their control over substantial portions of rural areas in Volhynia and southwestern Polesia. While the Germans controlled the large towns and major roads, such a large area east of Rivne had come under the control of the OUN-B that it was able to set about creating a "state" system with military training schools, hospitals and a school system, involving tens of thousands of personnel. Its combat organization, the UPA, which came under the command of Roman Shukhevich in August 1943, would fight only limited skirmishes and defensive actions against the Germans. The USSR was considered the primary enemy, and the fight against the Soviets continued until the mid-1950s. It would also play a major role in the massacres of Poles in Volhynia and Eastern Galicia from western Ukraine.

Towards the end of the war
It is believed that the OUN ordered the assassination of Ukrainian writer Yaroslav Halan in 1949 who was highly critical of the organisation.

After the Second World War

After the war, the OUN in eastern and southern Ukraine continued to struggle against the Soviets; 1958 marked the last year when an OUN member was arrested in Donetsk. Both branches of the OUN continued to be quite influential within the Ukrainian diaspora. The OUN-B was formed in 1943 by an organization called the Anti-Bolshevik Bloc of Nations (headed by Yaroslav Stetsko). The Anti-Bolshevik Bloc of Nations it created and headed would include at various times emigre organizations from almost every eastern European country with the exception of Poland: Croatia, the Baltic countries of Estonia, Latvia and Lithuania, anti-communist emigre Cossacks, Hungary, Georgia, Bohemia-Moravia (today the Czech Republic), and Slovakia. In the 1970s, the ABN was joined by anti-communist Vietnamese and Cuban organizations. The Lithuanian partisans had particularly close ties with the OUN.

In 1956 Bandera's OUN split into two parts, the more moderate OUN(z) led by Lev Rebet and Zinoviy Matla, and the more conservative OUN led by Stepan Bandera.

After the dissolution of the Soviet Union, both OUN factions resumed activities within Ukraine. The Melnyk faction threw its support behind the Ukrainian Republican Party at the time that it was headed by Levko Lukyanenko. The OUN-B reorganized itself within Ukraine as the Congress of Ukrainian Nationalists (KUN) (registered as a political party in January 1993). Its conspirational leaders within the diaspora did not want to openly enter Ukrainian politics and attempted to imbue this party with a democratic, moderate facade. However, within Ukraine, the project attracted more primitive nationalists who took the party to the right. Until her death in 2003, KUN was headed by Slava Stetsko, widow of Yaroslav Stetsko, who also simultaneously headed the OUN and the Anti-Bolshevik Bloc of Nations.

On 9 March 2010 the Kyiv Post reported that the OUN political party rejected Yulia Tymoshenko's calls to unite "all of the national patriotic forces" led Bloc Yulia Tymoshenko against President Viktor Yanukovych. The OUN political party did demand that Yanukovych should reject the idea of cancelling the Hero of Ukraine status given to Stepan Bandera and Roman Shukhevych, Yanukovych should continue the practice of recognizing fighters for Ukraine's independence, which was launched by (his predecessor) Viktor Yushchenko, and posthumously award the Hero of Ukraine titles to Symon Petliura and Yevhen Konovalets.

On 19 November 2018 Organization of Ukrainian Nationalists and fellow Ukrainian nationalist political organizations Congress of Ukrainian Nationalists, Right Sector and C14 endorsed Ruslan Koshulynskyi's candidacy in the 2019 Ukrainian presidential election. In the election Koshulynskyi received 1.6% of the votes.

Organization
The OUN was led by a Vozhd or Supreme Leader. Originally the Vozhd was Yevhen Konovalets ; after his assassination he was succeeded by Andriy Melnyk resulting in a split where the Galician youths followed their own Vozhd, Stepan Bandera. Underneath the Vozhd were the Provid, or directorate. At the start of the second world war the OUN's leadership consisted of the Vozhd, Andrii Melnyk, and eight members of the Provid. The Provid members were: Generals Kurmanovych and Kapustiansky (both generals from the times of Ukraine's revolution in 1918–1920); Yaroslav Baranovsky, a law student; Dmytro Andriievsky, a politically moderate former diplomat of the revolutionary government from eastern Ukraine; Richard Yary, a former officer of the Austrian and Galician militaries who served as a liaison with the German intelligence services, the Abwehr; colonel Roman Sushko, another former Austrian and Galician officer; Mykola Stsyborsky, the son of a tsarist military officer from Zhytomir, who served as the OUN's official theorist; and Omelian Senyk, a party organizer and veteran of the Austrian and Galician armies who by the 1940s was considered too moderate and too conservative by the youngest generation of Galician youths. Yary would be the only member of the original Provid to join Bandera after the OUN split.

Ideology
The OUN was formed from the UVO and several extreme right-wing organizations, including the Ukrainian National Association, the Union of Ukrainian Fascists and the Union for the Liberation of Ukraine. Initially, it was led by war veterans who failed to establish a Ukrainian state in 1917–1920. According to Per Anders Rudling, the ideology of the organization was heavily influenced by the philosophy of Nietzsche, German National Socialism and Italian Fascism; combining extreme nationalism with terrorism, corporatism, and antisemitism. Heorhii Kasyanov wrote that it manifested typical anti-democractic features.

According to its initial declaration, the primary goal of OUN was to establish an independent and ethnically pure Ukrainian state. This goal was to be achieved by a national revolution, that would drive out all foreign element and set up an authoritarian state led by a strong man. The OUN's leadership felt that past attempts at securing independence failed due to democratic values in society, poor party discipline and a conciliatory attitude towards Ukraine's traditional enemies. Its ideology rejected the socialist ideas supported by Petliura, and the compromises of Galicia's traditional elite. Instead, the OUN, particularly its younger members, adopted the ideology of Dmytro Dontsov, an émigré from Eastern Ukraine.

Integral nationalism
The Ukrainian nationalism of the 19th and early 20th centuries had been largely liberal or socialist, combining Ukrainian national consciousness with patriotism and humanist values. In contrast, the nationalists who emerged in Galicia following the First World War, much as in the rest of Europe, adopted the form of nationalism known as Integral nationalism. According to this ideology, the nation was held to be of the highest absolute value, more important than social class, regions, the individual, religion, etc. To this end, OUN members were urged to "force their way into all areas of national life" such as institutions, societies, villages and families. Politics was seen as a Darwinian struggle between nations for survival, rendering conflict unavoidable and justifying any means that would lead to the victory of one's nation over that of others. In this context willpower was seen as more important than reason, and warfare was glorified as an expression of national vitality.

Integral nationalism became a powerful force in much of Europe during the 1920s and 1930s. The OUN's conceptualization of this idea was particular in several ways. Because Ukraine was stateless and surrounded by more powerful neighbors, the emphasis on force and warfare was to be expressed in acts of terrorism rather than open warfare, and illegality was glorified. Because Ukrainians did not have a state to glorify or serve, the emphasis was placed on a "pure" national language and culture rather than a State. There was a strain of fantastic romanticism, in which the unsophisticated Ukrainian rejection of reason was more spontaneous and genuine than the cynical rejection of reason by German or Italian integral nationalists.

The OUN viewed the Ukrainian Greek Catholic Church as a rival and condemned Catholic leaders as police informers or potential informers; the Church rejected integral nationalism as incompatible with Christian ethics. The conflict between the OUN and the Church eased in the late 1930s.

Myth and nationalism of the deed
Dmytro Dontsov claimed that the 20th century would witness the "twilight of the gods to whom the nineteenth century prayed" and that a new man must be created, with the "fire of fanatical commitment" and the "iron force of enthusiasm", and that the only way forward was through "the organization of a new violence." This new doctrine was the chynnyi natsionalizm – the "nationalism of the deed". To dramatize and spread such views, OUN literature mythologized the cult of struggle, sacrifice, and emphasized national heroes.

The OUN, particularly Bandera, held a romantic view of the Ukrainian peasantry, glorified the peasants as carriers of Ukrainian culture and linked them with the deeds and exploits of the Ukrainian Cossacks from previous centuries. The OUN believed that a goal of professional revolutionaries was, through revolutionary acts, to awaken the masses. In this aspect the OUN had much in common with 19th-century Russian Narodniks.

Connection to fascism 
Historian Per Anders Rudling described the OUN as having "the fascist attributes of antiliberalism, anticonservatism, and anticommunism, an armed party, totalitarianism, anti-Semitism, 'Führerprinzip', and an adoption of fascist greetings. Its leaders eagerly emphasized to Hitler and Ribbentrop that they shared the Nazi 'Weltanschauung' and a commitment to a fascist New Europe." He described it as a "typical fascist movement" and wrote that it "cultivated close relations with Fascist Italy, Nazi Germany, the Spanish Falange and the Croatian Ustaše".

According to political scientist Ivan Gomza, the "morphological structure" of the OUN's ideology in the 1930s and early 1940s could be defined as fascist because it had the following principles:

(1) Rebirth of the national community

(2) The search for some new form of political and economic organization, which transcends liberal democracy and collectivistic communism

(3) The use of threats and violence during its political struggle.

Gomza wrote that OUN writers rejected both Soviet communism and liberal democracy and wished to instill a single-party state, living in the unrealized glory of battles past and an economic system that aimed to avoid class conflict. He also argued that violence was an "extensive, widespread and frequent" occurrence and was central in the group's ideology and policy; the group took advantage of wartime chaos to eliminate Polish, Muscovite and Jewish activist groups. However, he wrote that after 1943 some "peripheral concepts" came to substitute the fascist core, which led to a splinter within the OUN and subsequent democratization of one of its factions.

The political scientist Ivan Katchanovski described it as "a semi-totalitarian organization which combined elements of extreme nationalism and fascism". Historian Grzegorz Rossoliński-Liebe wrote that the OUN had "created its own form of fascism" and that it "attempted to become a mass movement and to establish an ethnically homogenous Ukrainian state. It viewed and used mass violence as a political aim and killed civilians en masse." He also wrote that the members of the movement "claimed to be related to movements such as the Italian Fascists, the German Nazis, the Ustasa, and the Iron Guard".

Marples has described how some writers in the OUN tradition, as well as some later Ukrainian writers, have been "self-deceptive" in emphasizing the absence of racism from OUN ideology, downplaying its connection to western European fascism, and suggesting that the Ukrainian brand of nationalism was a product of domestic development.

Political scientist Alexander J. Motyl considered the OUN to have fascist inclinations, but viewed it to be a kind of nationalist movement, with differences from fascism arising from the goal of nationalists to create nations, rather than run existing nations. He compared it in its nature to other national liberation movements which had authoritarian inclinations, strong leaders, and engaged in violence and terrorism, such as the Algerian National Liberation Front or the Palestine Liberation Organization. According to historian Stanley Payne "there were elements in [the OUN] that favored fascism, but it was not so much a revolutionary movement as a composite radical nationalism". He said it was "highly authoritarian and violently antisemitic" but said that was "rather common in the East European politics of the era". According to him, it was on the "extreme end of the radical right but not fully fascist", and the ideology was comparable to Putinism, saying the only difference between them is the antisemitism.

Metamorphosis beyond WWII 

Many Ukrainian historians, such as Peter Potichnyj, have argued that from 1941 and especially after the war, the OUN developed in a pro-democratic and anti-Nazi direction. After the Second World War, OUN émigrés and UPA members began to produce documents that emphasised this shift and downplayed the controversial aspects of the organization. For example, they published anti-Nazi texts by OUN activists. In some documents they removed statements related to fascism or the Holocaust, or they reprinted the April 1941 resolution in Cracow of the Second Great Congress of OUN, omitting that the organization adopted the official salute which consisted in the fascist salute while shouting "Glory to Ukraine! Glory to the Heroes!".

OUN's denials of its role in the Holocaust began in 1943 after it became obvious that Germany would lose the war. What Rossolinski describes as a whitewashing of its history continued after the war, with OUN's propaganda describing its legacy as a "heroic Ukrainian resistance against the Nazis and the Communists".

In 1943 the OUN developed a new political program that focused on a "new order of a free individual. A man's free will should animate social life." The group also accepted the following:"(1) the OUN renounced the principles of economic centralism and adopted the idea of a market economy (Zakordonni chastyny Orhanizatsiyi Ukrayinskykh Natsionalistiv, 1955, 261; Iarlan, 1986, 159)(2) it rejected the aggressive rhetoric concerning national minorities and claimed "we must abandon the chauvinism and
assimilation politics towards the minorities and create optimum conditions for national and cultural tolerance" (Stepanov
1946, 113e114)(3) the idea of a unique labor union was rejected (Resolutions of the 3rd Extraordinary Great
Council of the OUN, 1943, 231)(4) the OUN adopted central political ideals of liberal democracy, proclaiming to "stand for
real democracy, liberty of speech, freedom of assembly, and liberty of conscience, but against all kinds of dictatorship and
totalitarianism" (Poltava, 1950, 18).″

Though the groups realized allegiance to these edits, and whether the group could in fact remove itself from the label of fascism is debated among historians, the result of these changes led to a split, which divided the faction into two groups, the fascists, and the liberals. The infighting of these groups was limited to diasporic communities in the US, Canada, and Germany. notably, the liberal faction became more powerful due to support from the United States Government which funded multiple thinktanks including the Prolog Research and Publishing Company.

Authoritarianism
The nation was to be unified under a single party led by a hierarchy of proven fighters. At the top was to be a Supreme Leader or Vozhd. In some respects the OUN's creed was similar to that of other eastern European, radical right-wing agrarian movements, such as Romania's Legion of the Archangel Michael (more commonly known as the Iron Guard), Croatia's Ustashe, Hungary's Arrow Cross Party, and similar groups in Slovakia and Poland. There were, however, significant differences within the OUN regarding its relationship to fascism. The more moderate leaders living in exile admired some facets of Benito Mussolini's fascism but condemned Nazism while the younger more radical members based within Ukraine admired the fascist ideas and methods as practised by the Nazis. The faction-based abroad supported rapprochement with the Ukrainian Catholic Church while the younger radicals were anti-clerical and felt that not considering the Nation to be the Absolute was a sign of weakness.

The two factions of the OUN each had their own understanding of the nature of the leader. The Melnyk faction considered the leader to be the director of the Provid and in its writings emphasized a military subordination to the hierarchical superiors of the Provid. It was more autocratic than totalitarian. The Bandera faction, in contrast, emphasized complete submission to the will of the supreme leader.

At a party congress in August 1943, the OUN-B rejected much of its fascistic ideology in favor of a social democratic model, while maintaining its hierarchical structure. This change could be attributed in part to the influence of the leadership of Roman Shukhevych, the new leader of UPA, who was more focused on military matters rather than on ideology and was more receptive to different ideological themes than were the fanatical OUN-B political leaders, and was interested in gaining and maintaining the support of deserters or others from Eastern Ukraine. During this party congress, the OUN-B backed off its commitment to private ownership of land, increased worker participation in the management of industry, equality for women, free health services and pensions for the elderly, and free education. Some points in the program referred to the rights of national minorities and guaranteed freedom of speech, religion, and the press and rejected the official status of any doctrine. Nevertheless, the authoritarian elements were not discarded completely and were reflected in the continued insistence on the "heroic spirit" and "social solidarity, friendship and discipline."

In exile, the OUN's ideology was focused on opposition to communism.

Treatment of non-Ukrainians

The OUN intended to create a Ukrainian state with widely understood Ukrainian territories, but inhabited by Ukrainian people narrowly understood, according to Timothy Snyder. Its first congress in 1929 resolved that "Only the complete removal of all occupiers from Ukrainian lands will allow for the general development of the Ukrainian Nation within its own state." OUN's "Ten Commandments" stated: "Aspire to expand the strength, riches, and size of the Ukrainian State even by means of enslaving foreigners" or "Thou shalt struggle for the glory, greatness, power, and space of the Ukrainian state by enslaving the strangers". This formulation was modified by OUN's theoreticians in the 1950s and shortened to "Thou shalt struggle for the glory, greatness, power, and space of the Ukrainian state".

According to Door Karel C. Berkhoff, the organisation in October 1943, issued a communication (in Ukrainian only) that condemned the "mutual mass murders" of Ukrainians and Poles.

OUN and antisemitism
Antisemitism was a common attribute of agrarian radical right-wing Eastern European organizations, such as the Croatian Ustashe, the Yugoslav Zbor and the Romanian Iron Guard. The OUN's ideology, on the other hand, did not emphasize antisemitism and racism despite the presence of some antisemitic writing. Indeed, three of its leaders, General Mykola Kapustiansky, Rico Yary (himself of Hungarian-Jewish descent), and Mykola Stsyborsky (the OUN's chief theorist), were married to Jewish women and Jews belonged to the OUN's underground movement.

The OUN in the early 1930s considered Ukraine's primary enemies to be Poles and Russians, with Jews playing a secondary role or not considered an enemy. An article published in 1930 by OUN leader Mykola Stsyborsky denounced the anti-Jewish pogroms of 1918, stating that most of its victims were innocent rather than Bolsheviks. Stsyborsky wrote that Jewish rights should be respected, that the OUN ought to convince Jews that their organization was no threat to them and that Ukrainians ought to maintain close contacts with Jews nationally and internationally. Three years later, an article in the OUN journal Rozbudova Natsii ("Development of the Nation"), despite its focus on Jews' alleged exploitation of Ukrainian peasants, also stated that Jews, as well as Ukrainians, were victims of Soviet policies. Evhen Onatsky, writing in the OUN's official journal in 1934, condemned German National Socialism as imperialist, racist and anti-Christian.

By the late 1930s, the OUN's attitude towards Jews grew more negative. Jews were described in OUN publications as parasites who ought to be segregated from Ukrainians. For example,  called for Jews' complete cultural, economic and political isolation from Ukrainians, rejecting forced assimilation of Jews but allowing that they ought to enjoy the same rights as Ukrainians. Despite the increasingly negative portrayal of Jews, for all of its glorification of violence Ukrainian nationalist literature generally showed little interest in Nazi-like antisemitism during the 1930s. 

German documents from the early 1940s give the impression that extreme Ukrainian nationalists were indifferent to the plight of the Jews; they were willing to either kill them or help them, whichever was more appropriate, for their political goals. The OUN-B's ambivalent wartime attitude towards the Jews was highlighted during the Second General Congress of OUN-B (April 1941, Kraków)in which the OUN-B condemned anti-Jewish pogroms. and specifically warned against the pogromist mindset as useful only to Muscovite propaganda. At that conference the OUN-B declared "The Jews in the USSR constitute the most faithful support of the ruling Bolshevik regime and the vanguard of Muscovite imperialism in Ukraine. The Muscovite-Bolshevik government exploits the anti-Jewish sentiments of the Ukrainian masses to divert their attention from the true cause of their misfortune and to channel them in a time of frustration into pogroms on Jews. The OUN combats the Jews as the prop of the Muscovite-Bolshevik regime and simultaneously it renders the masses conscious of the fact that the principal foe is Moscow."

On the other hand, the OUN was willing to support Nazi antisemitic policies if doing so would help their cause. The OUN sought German recognition for an independent Ukrainian state. Despite its declared condemnation of pogroms in April 1941, when German official Reinhard Heydrich requested "self-cleansing actions" in June of that year the OUN organized militias who killed several thousand Jews in western Ukraine soon afterward that year. During the German invasion of the USSR, Yaroslav Stetsko stated in a report to Bandera: "We are raising a militia that will assist in the extermination of Jews... I am of the opinion that the Jews should be annihilated by applying the German methods of extermination in Ukraine." The Ukrainian People's Militia under the OUN's command led pogroms that resulted in the massacre of 6,000 Jews in Lviv soon after that city's fall to German forces. OUN members spread propaganda urging people to engage in pogroms. A slogan put forth by the Bandera group and recorded in the 16 July 1941 Einsatzgruppen report stated: "Long live Ukraine without Jews, Poles and Germans; Poles behind the river San, Germans to Berlin, and Jews to the gallows". In instructions to its members concerning how the OUN should behave during the war, it declared that "in times of chaos... one can allow oneself to liquidate Polish, Russian and Jewish figures, particularly the servants of Bolshevik-Muscovite imperialism" and further, when speaking of Russians, Poles, and Jews, to "destroy in struggle, particularly those opposing the regime, by means of: deporting them to their own lands, eradicating their intelligentsia, which is not to be admitted to any governmental positions, and overall preventing any creation of this intelligentsia (e.g. access to education etc)... Jews are to be isolated, removed from governmental positions in order to prevent sabotage... Those who are deemed necessary may only work under strict supervision and removed from their positions for slightest misconduct... Jewish assimilation is not possible." Ivan Klymiv, the OUN-B leader in Volhynia, wrote a directive in August 1941 calling for the OUN-B to "wipe out Poles, Jews, professors, officers, leaders, and all established enemy elements of Ukraine and Germany." OUN members who infiltrated the German police were involved in clearing ghettos and helping the Germans to implement the Final Solution. Although most Jews were actually killed by Germans, the OUN police working for them played a crucial supporting role in the liquidation of 200,000 Jews in Volyn in the beginning of the war OUN bands also killed Jews who had fled into the forests from the Germans. One of the UPA leaders reportedly compared the OUN's massacres of Poles to the Final Solution: "When it comes to the Polish question, this is not a military but a minority question. We will solve it as Hitler solved the Jewish question." The OUN did help some Jews to escape in isolated cases. According to a report to the Chief of the Security Police in Berlin, dated 30 March 1942, "...it has been clearly established that the Bandera movement provided forged passports not only for its own members, but also for Jews."

Once the OUN was at war with Germany, anti-Jewish instances lessened, but never stopped. According to documents released from the Security Service of Ukraine, the OUN not only never gave up its antisemitic ideology and always associated Jews with communists. Among the documents released was this, giving clear evidence of continued antisemitism.

Legacy
A number of contemporary far-right Ukrainian political organizations claim to be inheritors of the OUN's political traditions, including Svoboda, Right Sector, the Ukrainian National Assembly – Ukrainian National Self Defence, and the Congress of Ukrainian Nationalists. According to historian Per Anders Rudling, one of the reasons the role of the OUN remains contested in historiography is the fact that some of these later political inheritors developed literature justifying or denying the organization's fascist political heritage and collaboration with Nazi Germany.

Symbols

The organization's symbols were established in 1932 and were published in a magazine 'Building a Nation' (Rozbudova Natsii). The author of the OUN emblem with a stylized trident was Robert Lisovskyi. The organization's anthem "We were born in a great hour" was finalized in 1934 and also was published in the same magazine. Its lyrics were written by Oles Babiy, and it music by composer Omelian Nyzhankivsky.

For a long time OUN did not officially have its own flag. However, during the Hungarian campaign against the Republic of Carpathian Ukraine in 1939, Carpathian Sich, a militarized wing of OUN, adopted its flag from the OUN's emblem – a golden nationalistic trident on a blue background. The flag was finalized and officially adopted by the organization only in 1964 at the 5th Assembly of Ukrainian Nationalists.

When the organisation split in 1941, OUN-r refused to adopt the nationalistic trident as a symbol and came up with its own heraldry. Lisovskyi created the organizational emblem for OUN-r as well. The central element of the new emblem was a stylized cross within a triangle. According to Bohdan Hoshovsky, the color combination of red and black was based on a concept of the OUN ideologue and veteran of the Ukrainian Galician Army Yulian Varanasi.

The red and black colors, common in Ukrainian embroidery, represent blood and Ukraine's black soil. Natalia Khanenko-Friesen, director of the Canadian Institute of Ukrainian Studies (and scholar of Ukrainian folklore) explained the red is traditionally synonymous with "life" rather than with violence. "Blood as life, as blossom, and not as blood lost in battles."

2019 official veteran status 
In late March 2019 former OUN combatants (and other living former members of irregular Ukrainian nationalist armed groups that were active during World War II and the first decade after the war) were officially granted the status of veterans. This meant that for the first time they could receive veteran benefits, including free public transport, subsidized medical services, annual monetary aid, and public utilities discounts (and will enjoy the same social benefits as former Ukrainian soldiers Red Army of the Soviet Union).

There had been several previous attempts to provide former Ukrainian nationalist fighters with official veteran status, especially during the 2005–2009 administration President Viktor Yushchenko, but all failed.

Leaders

Early OUN

OUN (Melnyk)
 Andriy Melnyk (1940–1964)
 Oleh Shtul (1964–1977)
 Denys Kvitkovskyi (1977–1979)
 Mykola Plaviuk (1979–2012)
 Bohdan Chervak (2012–present)

OUN (Bandera)
 Stepan Bandera (1940–1959)
 Stepan Lenkavskyi (1959–1968)
 Yaroslav Stetsko (1968–1986)
 Vasyl Oleskiv (1986–1991)
 Slava Stetsko (1991–2001)
 Andriy Haidamakha (2001–2009)
 Stefan Romaniw (2009–2022)
Oleh Medunytsia (2022–present)

OUN (abroad)
 Zenon Matla (1954–1956)
 Lev Rebet (1956–1957)
 Roman Ilnytskyi (1957–?)
 Bohdan Kordyuk (?–1979)
 Daria Rebet (1979–1991)
 Anatol Kaminskyi (1991–present)

See also
 Warsaw Process

References

Notes

Footnotes

Bibliography 
 
 Gomza, I. (2015). Elusive Proteus: A study in the ideological morphology of the Organization of Ukrainian Nationalists. Communist and Post-Communist Studies, 48(2/3), 195–207.
 Jonathan Levy, The Intermarium: Wilson, Madison, & East Central European Federalism.
 Paul Robert Magocsi (1989), Morality and Reality: the Life and Times of Andrei Sheptytskyi, Edmonton Alberta: Canadian Institute of Ukrainian Studies, University of Alberta, .
  
 Grzegorz Motyka (2005), Służby bezpieczeństwa Polski i Czechosłowacji wobec Ukraińców (1945–1989), Instytut Pamięci Narodowej, Warszawa, .  
  
 Rossoliński-Liebe, G. (2019). Inter-Fascist Conflicts in East Central Europe: The Nazis, the “Austrofascists,” the Iron Guard, and the Organization of Ukrainian Nationalists. In G. Rossoliński-Liebe & A. Bauerkämper (Eds.), Fascism without Borders: Transnational Connections and Cooperation between Movements and Regimes in Europe from 1918 to 1945 (1st ed., pp. 168–191). Berghahn Books.
 Shkandrij, M. (2015). The Organization of Ukrainian Nationalists. In Ukrainian Nationalism: Politics, Ideology, and Literature, 1929-1956 (pp. 101–132). Yale University Press.
 Władysław Siemaszko, Ewa Siemaszko (2000), Ludobójstwo dokonane przez nacjonalistów ukraińskich na ludności polskiej Wołynia 1939–1945, Kancelaria Prezydenta Rzeczpospolitej Polskiej, Warszawa, tom I i II, 1,433 pages, photos, quells, .  
 
 Orest Subtelny, Ukraine: A History, Toronto: University of Toronto Press, 1988, .
 Andrew Wilson, The Ukrainians: Unexpected Nation, New Haven: Yale University Press, 2000, .
 Антонюк Ярослав Діяльність, "СБ ОУН на Волині." Луцьк : «Волинська книга», 2007. – 176 с.
 Антонюк Ярослав Діяльність, "СБ ОУН(б) на Волині таЗахідному Поліссі (1946–1951)" : Монографія. – Луцьк: «Надстир'я-Ключі», 2013. – 228 с.

External links
 Organization of Ukrainian Nationalists webpage in Ukrainian
 War memoirs of an OUN veteran.

 
Anti-communism in Ukraine
Defunct political parties in Ukraine
Far-right politics in Ukraine
Modern history of Ukraine
Political history of Ukraine
Anti-Polish sentiment in Europe
Anti-Romanian sentiment
Ukrainian anti-Soviet resistance movement
History of Ukraine (1918–1991)
Second Polish Republic
Politics of the Soviet Union
1929 establishments in Ukraine
1929 establishments in Poland
Terrorism in Poland
Ukrainian collaborators with Nazi Germany
Fascist organizations
Anti-communist organizations
Nationalist terrorism in Europe
Antisemitism in Ukraine
Holocaust perpetrators in Poland
Anti-communist terrorism